Elisabeth Kübler-Ross (July 8, 1926 – August 24, 2004) was a Swiss-American psychiatrist, a pioneer in near-death studies, and author of the internationally best-selling book, On Death and Dying (1969), where she first discussed her theory of the five stages of grief, also known as the "Kübler-Ross model".

Kübler-Ross was a 2007 inductee into the National Women's Hall of Fame, was named by Time as one of the "100 Most Important Thinkers" of the 20th century and was the recipient of nineteen honorary degrees. By July 1982, Kübler-Ross taught 125,000 students in death and dying courses in colleges, seminaries, medical schools, hospitals, and social-work institutions. In 1970, she delivered an Ingersoll Lecture at Harvard University on the theme On Death and Dying.

Early life and education
Elisabeth Kübler was born on July 8, 1926, in Zürich, Switzerland, into a Protestant Christian Family. She was one of a set of triplets, two of whom were identical. Her life was jeopardized due to complications, weighing only 2 pounds at birth, but she said she survived due to her mother's love and attentiveness. Elisabeth later contracted pneumonia and was hospitalized at age 5, during which she had her first experience with death as her roommate died peacefully. Her early experiences with death led her to believe that, because death is a necessary stage of life, one must be prepared to face it with dignity and peace.

During World War II, Elisabeth worked as a laboratory assistant for refugees in Zürich at only 13 years of age. Following the war, she did relief work in France, Germany, Belgium, Denmark, Sweden, Czechoslovakia, and Poland. She would later visit the Majdanek extermination camp in Poland in 1954, which sparked her interest in the power of compassion and resilience of the human spirit. The horror stories of the survivors left permanent impressions on Elisabeth, and led to her decision in dedicating her life to the help and healing of others. She was also profoundly affected by the images of hundreds of butterflies carved into some of the walls there. To Kübler-Ross, the butterflies—these final works of art by those facing death—stayed with her for years and influenced her thinking about the end of life. During this same year, she also became involved with the International Voluntary Service for peace as an activist.

From a young age, Elisabeth was determined to become a doctor despite her father's efforts in forcing her to become a secretary for his business. She refused him and left home at 16.  She began working as a housemaid for a mean woman, where she met a doctor who wished to help her in becoming a doctor. She then worked as an apprentice for a Dr. Braun, a scientist in her hometown, up until he went bankrupt. Here, she remembered getting her first lab coat with her name on it. Then, she worked for a dermatologist named Dr. Kan Zehnder.  After this time she worked to support herself in a variety of jobs, gaining major experience in hospitals while volunteering to provide aid to refugees. Following this she went on to attend the University of Zurich to study medicine, and graduated in 1957.

Academic career
After graduating from the University of Zurich in 1957, Kübler-Ross moved to New York in 1958 to work and continue her studies.

She began her psychiatric residency in the Manhattan State Hospital in the early 1960s, and began her career working to create treatment for those who were schizophrenic along with those faced with the title "hopeless patient", a term used at the time to reference terminal patients. These treatment programs would work to restore the patient's sense of dignity and self-respect. Kübler-Ross also intended to reduce the medications that kept these patients overly sedated, and found ways to help them relate to the outside world.  During this time, Ross was horrified by the neglect and abuse of mental patients as well as the imminently dying. She found that the patients were often treated with little care or completely ignored by the hospital staff. This realization made her strive to make a difference in the lives of these individuals. She developed a program that focused on the individual care and attention for each patient. This program worked incredibly well, and resulted in significant improvement in the mental health of 94% of her patients.

In 1962, she accepted a position at the University of Colorado School of Medicine. There, Kübler-Ross worked as a junior faculty member and gave her first interview of a young terminally ill woman in front of a roomful of medical students. Her intentions were not to be an example of pathology, but she wanted to depict a human being who desired to be understood as she was coping with her illness and how it has impacted her life. She stated to her students:Now you are reacting like human beings instead of scientists. Maybe now you'll not only know how a dying patient feels but you will also be able to treat them with compassion – the same compassion that you would want for yourself Kübler-Ross completed her training in psychiatry in 1963, and moved to Chicago in 1965. She sometimes questioned the practices of traditional psychiatry that she observed. She also undertook 39 months of classical psychoanalysis training in Chicago. She became an instructor at the University of Chicago's Pritzker School of Medicine where she began to conduct a regular weekly educational seminar consisting of live interviews with terminally ill patients. She had her students participate in these despite a large amount of resistance from the medical staff.

In November 1969, Life magazine ran an article on Kübler-Ross,  bringing public awareness to her work outside of the medical community. The response was enormous and influenced Kübler-Ross's decision to focus on her career on working with the terminally ill and their families. The intense scrutiny her work received also had an impact on her career path. Kübler-Ross stopped teaching at the university to work privately on what she called the "greatest mystery in science"—death.

During the 1970s Kübler-Ross became the champion of the world wide hospice movement. She traveled to over twenty countries on six continents initiating various hospice and palliative care programs. In 1970, Kübler-Ross spoke at the prestigious Ingersoll Lecture at Harvard University on the subject of on death and dying. On August 7, 1972, she spoke to the United States Senate Special Committee on Aging to promote the "Death With Dignity" movement. In 1977, she was named "Woman of the Year" by Ladies' Home Journal.

Healing center
Kübler-Ross was one of the central figures in the hospice care movement, believing that euthanasia prevents people from completing their "unfinished business".

In 1977 she persuaded her husband to buy forty acres of land in Escondido, California, near San Diego, where she founded "Shanti Nilaya" (Home of Peace). She intended it as a healing center for the dying and their families. She was also a co-founder of the American Holistic Medical Association.

In the late 1970s, after interviewing thousands of patients who had died and been resuscitated, she became interested in out-of-body experiences, mediumship, spiritualism, and other ways of attempting to contact the dead. This led to a scandal connected to the Shanti Nilaya Healing Center, in which she was duped by Jay Barham, founder of the Church of the Facet of the Divinity. Claiming he could channel the spirits of the departed and summon ethereal "entities", he encouraged church members to engage in sexual relations with the "spirits". He may have hired several women to play the parts of female spirits for this purpose. Kubler-Ross' friend Deanna Edwards was invited to attend a service to ascertain whether allegations against Barham were true. He was found to be naked and wearing only a turban when Edwards unexpectedly pulled masking tape off the light switch and flipped on the light. Despite the accusation of sexual misconduct Kübler-Ross protected him for over a year. Then she announced the ending of her association with both Jay Barham and his wife Martha in her Shanti Nilaya Newsletter (issue 7) on June 7, 1981.

Investigations on near-death experiences
Kübler-Ross also dealt with the phenomenon of near-death experience. She was also an advocate for spiritual guides and afterlife, serving on the Advisory Board of the International Association for Near-Death Studies (IANDS). 

Kübler-Ross reported her interviews with the dying for the first time in her book, On Death and Dying: What the Dying Have to Teach Doctors, Nurses, Clergy, and Their Own Families (1969). 

Kübler-Ross went on to write more about near-death experiences (NDEs) in her books On Life After Death (1991) and The Tunnel and The Light (1999).

Her work with children 
Throughout her career, Kübler-Ross worked extensively with children and wrote two books called Living with Death and Dying (1981) and On Children and Dying (1983) where she wrote about the unique ways that children perceive, discuss, and recognize death. Written after many patients and readers asked her for a more in depth look into language that terminally ill children use when conveying their needs, she wrote Living with Death and Dying in 1981. She states that children recognize death much more than we give them credit for and they discuss it with less hesitation than we assume. The language that children use is somewhat unique to them, depending on their age. Young children tend to use what Kübler-Ross stated as "Nonverbal Symbolic Language", where the use of drawings, pictures, or objects allows them to talk about their understanding of death, since they likely do know the words to use. Even as people age, they may not have the words to describe their needs. That is why Kübler-Ross recognized a second form of language that is typically used by older children, adolescents, and sometimes adults. This is known as "Verbal Symbolic Language", where elaborate stories and bizarre questions are used to express their feelings on death. Children may be fearful of asking direct questions regarding their death, so they may come up with stories or strange questions that will meet their needs.

AIDS work
During a time where patients suffering from AIDS were being disowned and discriminated against for their illness, Kübler-Ross accepted them with open arms. She conducted many workshops on life, death, grief, and AIDS in different parts of the world, teaching about the disease and working to reduce the stigma surrounding it. In December 1983, she moved both her home and workshop headquarters to her own farm in Head Waters, Virginia, to reduce her extensive traveling. Later, she created a workshop meant solely for patients who had contracted AIDS; even though the majority of people who contracted AIDS at that time were gay men, women and children also contracted the disease. This surprised her, as she had not expected just how many children and babies had contracted the terminal illness. She noted in her book that babies typically contracted the disease through the mother or father or through contaminated blood transfusions, also remarking that older children that had the disease may have contracted it due to sexual assault from someone who was HIV-seropositive.

One of her greatest wishes was to build a hospice for abandoned infants and children infected with HIV to give them a lasting home where they could live until their death. Kübler-Ross attempted to set this up in the late 1980s in Virginia, but local residents feared the possibility of infection and blocked the necessary re-zoning. In October 1994, she lost her house and many possessions, including photos, journals, and notes, to an arson fire that is suspected to have been set by opponents of her AIDS work.

Contributions 
Kübler-Ross was the first individual to transfigure the way that the world looks at the terminally ill, she pioneered hospice care, palliative care, bioethics, and near-death research, and was the first to bring terminally ill individuals' lives to the public eye. Kübler-Ross was the driving force behind the movement for doctors and nurses alike to "treat the dying with dignity".  Her extensive work with the dying led to the internationally best-selling book On Death and Dying in 1969, she proposed the now famous five stages of grief as a pattern of adjustment: denial, anger, bargaining, depression, and acceptance. In general, individuals experience most of these stages when faced with their imminent death. The five stages of grief have since been adopted by bereavement as applying to the survivors of a loved one's death as well alike. After 2000 an increasing number of companies began using the five stages model to explain reactions to change and loss. This is now known as the "Kübler-Ross Change Curve"®️ and is used by a large variety of Fortune 500 companies in the US and internationally. In 2018 Stanford University acquired the Kübler-Ross archives from her family and intends to build a digital library of her papers, interviews and other archival material. The American Journal of Bioethics devoted its entire December 2019 issue to the 50th anniversary of, On Death and Dying. The Elisabeth Kubler-Ross Foundation continues her work through a series of international chapters around the world.

Kübler-Ross wrote over 20 books on death and dying, which are now available in 44 languages. At the end of her life she was mentally active, co-authoring two books with David Kessler including On Grief and Grieving.

Personal life
In 1958, she married a fellow medical student and classmate from America, Emanuel "Manny" Ross, and moved to the United States. Together, they completed their internships at Long Island's Glen Cove Community Hospital in New York. After they married, she had their first child in 1960, a son named Kenneth, and in 1963, a daughter named Barbara. The marriage dissolved in 1979.

Final years and death
Kübler-Ross suffered a series of strokes between 1987 and 1995 which eventually left her partially paralyzed on her left side; in the meantime the Healing Waters Farm and the Elisabeth Kübler-Ross Center closed. After the Virginia house fire and subsequent stroke, she moved down to Scottsdale, Arizona, in October 1994. After suffering a larger stroke a few months later, she found herself living in a wheelchair and wished to be able to determine her time of death. 

In 1997, Oprah Winfrey flew to Arizona to interview Kübler-Ross and discuss with her whether she herself was going through the five stages of grief. Further, in a 2002 interview with The Arizona Republic, she stated that she was ready for death and even welcomed it, calling God a "damned procrastinator". 

Kübler-Ross died at a nursing home in Scottsdale on August 24, 2004, aged 78. She was buried at the Paradise Memorial Gardens Cemetery in Scottsdale. 

In 2005 her son, Ken Ross, founded the Elisabeth Kübler-Ross Foundation in Scottsdale, Arizona.

Selected bibliography

 On Death & Dying (Simon & Schuster/Touchstone), 1969. ISBN 978-1-4767-7554-8
 Questions & Answers on Death & Dying (Simon & Schuster/Touchstone), 1972
 Death: The Final Stage of Growth (Simon & Schuster/Touchstone), 1974
 Questions and Answers on Death and Dying: A Memoir of Living and Dying, Macmillan, 1976. .
 To Live Until We Say Goodbye (Simon & Schuster/Touchstone), 1978
 The Dougy Letter – A Letter to a Dying Child (Celestial Arts/Ten Speed Press), 1979
 Quest, Biography of EKR (Written with Derek Gill), (Harper & Row), 1980
 Working It Through (Simon & Schuster/Touchstone), 1981
 Living with Death & Dying (Simon & Schuster/Touchstone), 1981
 Remember the Secret (Celestial Arts/Ten Speed Press), 1981
 On Children & Death (Simon & Schuster), 1985
 AIDS: The Ultimate Challenge (Simon & Schuster), 1988
 On Life After Death (Celestial Arts), 1991
 Death Is of Vital Importance (The Tunnel and the Light), 1995
 Unfolding the Wings of Love (Germany only – Silberschnur), 1996
 Making the Most of the Inbetween (Various Foreign), 1996
 AIDS & Love, The Conference in Barcelona (Spain), 1996
 Longing to Go Back Home (Germany only – Silberschnur), 1997
 Working It Through: An Elisabeth Kübler-Ross Workshop on Life, Death, and Transition, Simon & Schuster, 1997. .
 The Wheel of Life: A Memoir of Living and Dying (Simon & Schuster/Scribner), 1997
 Why Are We Here (Germany only – Silberschnur), 1999
 The Tunnel and the Light (Avalon), 1999
 Life Lessons: Two Experts on Death and Dying Teach Us About the Mysteries of Life and Living, with David Kessler, Scribner, 2001. .
 On Grief and Grieving: Finding the Meaning of Grief Through the Five Stages of Loss, with David Kessler. Scribner, 2005. .
 Real Taste of Life: A photographic Journal, 2003

References

Further reading
 Quest: The Life of Elisabeth Kubler-Ross, by Derek Gill. Ballantine Books (Mm), 1982. .
 The Life Work of Dr. Elisabeth Kübler-Ross and its Impact on the Death Awareness Movement, by Michèle Catherine Gantois Chaban. E. Mellen Press, 2000. .
 Elisabeth Kubler-Ross: Encountering Death and Dying, by Richard Worth. Published by Facts On File, Inc., 2004. .
 Tea With Elisabeth tributes to Hospice Pioneer Dr. Elisabeth Kubler-Ross, compiled by Fern Stewart Welch, Rose Winters and Ken Ross, Published by Quality of Life Publishing Co 2009 
 Recollections of Dr. Elisabeth Kübler-Ross at the University of Chicago (1965–70), by Mark Siegler, MD. Published by the American Journal of Bioethics, 2019
 Tea with Elisabeth: Tributes to Hospice Pioneer Dr. Elisabeth Kubler-Ross. Published by Quality of Life Publishing, 2009

Viewing:
 Elisabeth Kübler-Ross: Facing Death (2003) Director & writer , 98 min
 Elisabeth Kubler-Ross – Speaks to a dying patient, Nova Interview, (1983)

External links

 Elisabeth Kübler-Ross Foundation
 Elisabeth Kübler-Ross papers housed at Stanford Libraries
 
  a 2003 Swiss German documentary
 BBC's Witness History Program – "Elisabeth Kübler-Ross and the Five Stages of Grief", 2020
 
 "The Queen of Dying: Elisabeth Kübler-Ross and the Five Stages", Radiolab, WNYC Studios, July 23, 2021

1926 births
2004 deaths
20th-century American women writers
American expatriates in Switzerland
American medical academics
American psychiatrists
American psychology writers
American self-help writers
American spiritual teachers
American spiritual writers
American women academics
American women psychiatrists
Grief
Hospice
Near-death experience researchers
Parapsychologists
People from Escondido, California
Scientists from Zürich
Persons involved with death and dying
Swiss emigrants to the United States
Triplets
University of Chicago faculty
University of Colorado alumni
University of Zurich alumni
Writers from Scottsdale, Arizona